Robert Vigneau (born 26 August 1933, in Nice) is a poet of French expression. He has published nine collections of poems, in major publishing houses (Gallimard, Seghers ...). His most famous poems are those he wrote for the youth (The Whale... two of his books were recommended by the Éducation nationale française).

Vigneau is also a draftsman: he has published two books of drawings, and exhibits periodically, in Japan and France.

Works 
Poetry
1953: L'Ange et l'accordéon, 
1963: Il, 
1972: Naigreries, Ravindra Press
1975: Cartes indiennes, La Main d'Hélène
1979: Articles sur catalogues, Prouvaires
1979: Bucolique followed by Élégiaque, Éditions Gallimard
2000: Bestiaire à Marie, Nathan, 1985, éditions éoliennes
1997: Botaniques, éditions éoliennes
2005: Planches d'anatomie, Adana Venci & éditions éoliennes
2009: Une vendange d'innocents, Maison de la Poésie

Texts and drawings
1995: La Guerre de cinquante ans, À hélice

Drawings
1978: Œufs, Adana Venci
2001: Entrée des créatures, Adana Venci
2014: Éros au potager, Adana Venci

External links 
 Site de Robert Vigneau
 Robert Vigneau on Ricochet-Jeunes
 Robert Vigneau on Vents d'ailleurs
 Espace littéraire : le poète Robert Vigneau à Annecy on Poussière Virtuelle
 Biographie

20th-century French poets
21st-century French poets
21st-century French male writers
French male poets
Prix Fénéon winners
1933 births
People from Nice
Living people
20th-century French male writers